Niall Murray (born 13 October 1999) is an Irish rugby union player, currently playing for Pro14 and European Rugby Champions Cup side Connacht. He plays in the  lock.

Connacht
Murray made his senior competitive debut for Connacht in their 27–24 victory against Gloucester in the 2018–19 European Rugby Champions Cup on 14 December 2019. Murray came on as a replacement in this match.

References

External links
itsrugby.co.uk Profile

1999 births
Living people
Irish rugby union players
Connacht Rugby players
Rugby union locks